KWYK-FM (94.9 FM) is a radio station  broadcasting adult contemporary music. Licensed to Aztec, New Mexico, the station is owned by Basin Broadcasting Company.

References

External links

WYK-FM
Mainstream adult contemporary radio stations in the United States
Radio stations established in 1978
1978 establishments in New Mexico